Hassan Hosni bin Saleh bin Abdul Wahhab bin Yusuf Al-Samadhi Al-Tujibi . He was born in Tunis, on Monday 27 Ramadan 1301 AH / 21 July 1884 AD - and died there on Saturday 18 Sha’ban 1388 AH / 9 November 1968 AD ) a Tunisian writer, linguist and historian, his name is compound: (Hassan Hosni)

Biography

Origins 
Hassan Hosni Abdel-Wahhab descended from a family of ease and prestige, as he descended from Banu Sumadih, one of the Taifa dynasties of al-Andalus. His grandfather, Abdel-Wahhab Bin Youssef Al-Tujibi, was in charge of the affairs of the country's National Guard (Al-Hawanib) and presided over the ceremonies during the reign of the Husainid Beys during the reigns of Muhammad Bey, Hussein Bey and Mustafa Bey and Ahmed Bey I. His father, Saleh bin Abd al-Wahhab, held several positions in the state, including a special translator for the Minister of Foreign Affairs, General Hussein, and Amel al- Bey in al-Awad (southern Tunisia) and Mahdia. As for his mother, he is descended from Ali bin Mustafa Agha Kayseri, one of Hayreddin Pasha's chief aides.

His upbringing 
He received his primary education in one of the schools of Tunis, then at the elementary school in Mahdia, where he memorized a quarter of the Qur’an and began learning French. Then he entered the first French school in the metropolis and obtained a certificate of primary sciences in 1899. At that time, he joined the Al-Sadiqi school and Bahadros Arabic and translation, then he went to the French capital, Paris, and joined the student body of the School of Political Science .  However, he returned to Tunisia upon the death of his father in 1904.

Career path 

Hassan Hosni Abdel Wahhab was fluctuated in several administrative positions, as he worked in the Department of Agriculture and Trade in the State Property Department between 1905 and 1910, then he was appointed head of the Department of the Zayatin Forest in the north of the Tunisian country . Head of the Tunisian archives treasury, and he was the first to put in place a device to index its contents.  In the same year, he was appointed as a leader (i.e., a governor) over the Muthalith, and the headquarters of the leadership was the city of Jabiana, and he moved with the same plan in 1928 to Mahdia and stayed there until 1935, to move to the tribal homeland and its headquarters in the city of Nabeul. In 1939, he returned to the city of Tunis to be appointed as Under-Secretary of the Local and Regional Administration for the Internal Administration of the Country. Then, he was appointed head of the Endowment Authority between 1942 and 1943 . On 3 May of this year, he was appointed Minister of the Pen at the beginning of the reign of Muhammad Al-Amin Bey, and he continued in this position until July 1947 .  After independence, he was appointed head of the National Institute of Archaeology and Arts between 1957 and 1962  and established during this period five museums, four of them for Islamic antiquities, and the fifth for Roman antiquities in Carthage.

Scientific activity 
Despite his assumption of administrative positions, Hassan Hosni Abdel Wahab had a distinguished scientific and cultural activity, and he did not stop writing, giving lessons and lectures.  Hassan Hosni Abdel-Wahhab participated in a large number of scientific and cultural conferences outside Tunisia, including: the orientalist conference organized in Algiers in 1905, he also participated in the Copenhagen conference in Denmark in 1908, the Paris conference of French orientalists in 1922 and the Rabat Al-Fath conference in Morocco in 1927 And the Oriental Music Conference in Cairo in 1932, along with several other conferences and symposia in which he represented the Tunisian government.

In addition, Hassan Hosni Abdel-Wahhab has been a member of the Academy of the Arabic Language in Damascus since 1919, the Academy of the Arabic Language in Cairo since 1932, the Iraqi Academic Academy and the French Academy of Inscriptions and Fine Arts since 1939,  He is also a member of the Egyptian Institute and a corresponding member of the Spanish Historical Institute.  He also had the opportunity to teach history at the Khalduniya School  between 1910 and 1924 .

Besides Arabic, Hassan Hosni Abdel Wahab speaks fluent French, and is relatively fluent in Italian and Turkish.

Concern for heritage 
Hassan Hosni Abdel Wahhab was fond of collecting manuscripts and rare books, and during his life he collected a large number of precious manuscripts and presented them to the Tunisian National Library .  Among the most important oldest copies of the Qur’an in the library of Hassan Hosni Abdel Wahhab in the National Library are the following:

 Fragment of a copy in antique kufic script, of 70 leaves.
 A piece of a copy, in antique Moroccan script, written on parchment, of 83 leaves.
 Fragment of a copy in antique kufic script, totaling 183 leaves.
 A piece of a copy written on parchment in kufic script, consisting of 49 leaves.

Books 
Hassan Hosni Abdel Wahhab has published an important number of books:

 The school team in Tunisian literature , first edition, Tunis, 1908 .
 Carpet Al-Aqiq in the Civilization of Kairouan and its poet Ibn Rashik , first edition, Tunis, 1912 .
 A summary of the history of Tunisia , first edition, Tunisia, 1918 .
 Guidance to the rules of economics , first edition, Tunisia 1919 .
 The entire history of Tunisian literature , first edition, Tunisia 1927 .
 The famous Tunisian women , first edition, Tunisia 1934 .
 Imam Al-Mazri , Dar Al-Kutub Al-Sharqiah, Tunisia, 1955 .
 Papers on Arab Civilization in Ifriqiya, Tunisia , in which he collected some of his articles published in magazines, and issued in three volumes, the first part in 1965 and the second in 1966 .
 The Book of Al-Omar fi Tunisian Works and Authors , edited by Bashir Al-Bakoush and Muhammad Al-Arousi Al-Matwi, published in 4 parts by Dar Al-Gharb Al-Islami in Beirut in 1990 .

Among the books compiled by Hassan Hosni Abdel Wahhab are:

 The works of the flags in his section History of Africa and Sicily by Lisan Al-Din bin Al-Khatib, printed in Palermo in 1910 .
 Letters of Criticism in Criticism of Poetry and Poets by Ibn Sharaf al-Qayrawani, published for the first time in 1911 in the Damascus magazine al-Muqtab.
 The Path to the Path of Abu Al-Ala Al-Maarri, it was published in Al-Muqtab magazine in 1912 .
 Description of Ifriqiya and Andalusia , taken from Ibn Fadlallah Al-Omari's book Masalak Al-Absar, published in Tunisia in 1920 .
 A book that works for the Saghani, which was published in Tunisia in 1924 .
 Insight into Trade by Al-Jahiz, first edition in Damascus in 1933, a second in Egypt in 1925, and a third in Beirut in 1966.
 The Book of Etiquette for Teachers by Muhammad bin Sahnoun on the authority of his father, published in Tunis in 1934 .
 Al -Jumana in Removing Linguistically in the Andalusian and Tunisian dialects of the unknown, edition of the Scientific Institute in Egypt, 1953.
 The Journey of Al-Tijani by Abdallah al-Tijani, Tunis 1958 edition.

As for his works and research, they are:

 The Islamic takeover of Sicily , Tunis edition in 1905 .
 The combination of the elements that make up the Tunisian people , edition in 1917 .
 Presenting Arabic music in the Levant, Morocco and Andalusia , edition in 1918 .
 Research on two Norman dinars in Mahdia , edition in 1930 .
 An eyewitness to open Andalusia , edition in 1932 .
 A Zig Zag in the History of the Aghlabids: The Revolt of Al-Tanabi , ed . 1937.

Awards and honours 

 Honorary Doctorate from the University of Science in Cairo in 1950 . 
 An honorary doctorate from the Algerian University of Sciences in 1960, he did not go for his support of the Algerian liberation revolution . 
 The State Appreciation Award in 1968, two days before his death, received on his behalf by the Speaker of the National Assembly, Sadok Mokaddem.

References 

1968 deaths
1884 births
20th-century Tunisian historians
Tunisian writers
Members of Academy of the Arabic Language in Cairo